Parliamentary elections were held in Slovakia on 25 and 26 September 1998. The elections resulted in the defeat of the Vladimír Mečiar government and the election of Mikuláš Dzurinda as Prime Minister. His party, the Slovak Democratic Coalition formed a coalition government with the Party of the Democratic Left, Party of the Hungarian Coalition, and the Party of Civic Understanding.

Participating parties

Results

Notes

References

Parliamentary elections in Slovakia
Slovakia
1998 in Slovakia
September 1998 events in Europe